"Rover" is a song by American rapper BlocBoy JB. It was released on January 13, 2018, as a standalone single. It was produced by Tay Keith.

A remix titled "Rover 2.0" featuring rapper 21 Savage was released on March 23, 2018. The remix peaked at number two on the US Bubbling Under Hot 100 Singles chart.

Music video 
A music video for the track was released on January 4, 2018, nine days before the track was released on streaming services. The video premiered on the WorldStarHipHop channel on YouTube.

Critical reception 
Michelle Kim of Pitchfork called the track a "banger" and a "bop", and said that the beat was "danceable".

Remix 

The remix of the track was released on March 23, 2018, with a feature from 21 Savage. The remix also included a brand new first verse by BlocBoy JB. The remix later appeared on BlocBoy JB's mixtape Simi.

Music video 
The music video was released on March 23, 2018, the same day as the single.

Critical reception 
Michelle Kim of Pitchfork said the remix "wasn't exactly an upgrade", and called BlocBoy's new verse "somewhat stilted".

Charts

References 

2018 songs
BlocBoy JB songs
Songs written by Tay Keith
Songs written by 21 Savage